Kalulushi is a town in the Copperbelt Province in north central Zambia. It is located on the M18 Road, just west of Kitwe. Municipal (district) population 75,806 at the 2000 census. Kalulushi emerged as a planned company town with the development of mining Companies in the mid-20th century - initially housing the main offices for the Zambia Consolidated Copper Mines. Economic activity in Kalulushi (as well as the surrounding area) declined severely with the closure of 2 Shaft and 7 Shaft Mining sites.

There is a famous story of the origin of the name Kalulushi. The story goes like this. Two gentlemen went hunting for rabbits. Rabbits, in the local Lamba language, are referred to as "kalulu." During their hunt they eventually spotted one rabbit. One of the gentlemen in excitement called out "kalulu!". The other gentlemen quietly told his friend, "shhhh" in order to avoid alarming the rabbit and prevent the rabbit from running away. So that's how the name Kalulushi came about. And so the story goes.
Kalulushi was established in 1953 as a company town for workers at the nearby Chibuluma copper and cobalt mine, and it became a public town in 1958. It is located 14 km (9 mi) west of Kitwe, the nearest rail station, at an altitude of 1,260 m (4,130 ft). The city's major employer is Chambishi metals. The Chati Forest Reserve west of the city manages large plantations of eucalyptus, tropical pine, and other exotic tree species supplying wood for the mining industry. The Woods are also supplied to ZESCO an electricity company.

Schools in Kalulushi 
Kalulushi has the second of the two independence stadiums in Zambia and boasts of a unique roundabout which has five (5) roads connecting to it.
The town is home to Chibuluma Rugby Club and Kalulushi Modern Stars FC both playing in the country's top flight leagues in rugby and football respectively

 Kalulushi trust school
 Chavuma high school
 Kalulushi high school 
 Mitobo Combined school
 Lubuto Basic School
 Masamba Basic School
 Kankonshi secondary school 
 St. Marcellins secondary school 
 Chati south boarding school
 Third-Day private school
 Bwaka Private School
 Chasi Academy school

Universities and Colleges 
Kalulushi has one University and two College:

Zambia Catholic University is a private owned university  located in President Avenue, Kalulushi, Zambia and run by the Zambia Episcopal Conference, the university is located in Kalulushi, 15.2 km (15 minutes drive) from the city of Kitwe.

The university opened in April 2008. As of 2011, degrees could be earned in education, development studies, business administration, economics, banking and finance, accountancy, human resource management and business information technology. In June 2011, student enrollment stood at 386.

Extracurricular activities include rowing, football, basketball, volleyball, bocce ball, the Utopian university magazine, the Social Action Committee and student unions for Catholics and non-Catholics.

The District  is also home two colleges:

Kalulushi College of Nursing (KCN) is a privately owned College which is located in Tigwilizane street off President Avenue, the college which offers Nursing training  was opened in 2017 and it has about 500 students.

Chibuluma College of Health Sciences is on a 12 hectare piece of land along the road to Chibuluma Mine. The college offers self-catering accommodation. The college has a multi-purpose sports court catering for tennis, volleyball, basketball, soccer. The college also has a tuckshop on campus

Mining

Kalulushi has the following mines:
 2 Shaft - Closed in the 90's
 7 Shaft - Closed in 2005
 Chambishi Metals Plc
 NFC Africa Mining Plc
 Chibuluma Mines Plc
 Chambishi Copper Smelter
 Kagem Mining Limited
 Gemcanton Mining Services Ltd

References

Populated places in Copperbelt Province
Kalulushi District